Sir Edward Dillwyn Williams  (born 1 April 1929) is a British medical scientist and a Fellow of the Learned Society of Wales.

References 
 WILLIAMS, Prof. Sir (Edward) Dillwyn’,   Who's Who 2012,  A & C Black,   2012;     online edn,   Oxford University Press, Dec 2011  ;     online edn, Nov 2011         accessed 22 Feb 2012

External links 
 academic homepage

1929 births
Fellows of the Royal College of Physicians
Fellows of the Royal College of Pathologists
Fellows of the Academy of Medical Sciences (United Kingdom)
Living people